The fifth season of Cougar Town, an American sitcom that airs on TBS, began airing on January 7, 2014. Season five regular cast members include Courteney Cox, Christa Miller, Busy Philipps, Brian Van Holt, Dan Byrd, Ian Gomez, and Josh Hopkins. The sitcom was created by Bill Lawrence and Kevin Biegel.

Production
On March 25, 2013, TBS renewed Cougar Town, produced by ABC Studios. The network has ordered 13 episodes for season five, which premiered on January 7, 2014. Matthew Perry guest starred as Sam, a wealthy, eccentric man who attempts to take Jules on a date. Perry marks the third former cast member of Friends to guest star on Cougar Town, after Lisa Kudrow and Jennifer Aniston. Brian Van Holt directed his first episode of Cougar Town this season, making him the second cast member to direct an episode.

Episodes

Ratings

U.S. Nielsen ratings

References

General references 
 
 

2014 American television seasons
Cougar Town seasons